Neophytus III was Ecumenical Patriarch of Constantinople from June 1636 to March 5, 1637.

Sources
 

17th-century Ecumenical Patriarchs of Constantinople
Clergy from Chios